The National Democratic Front of Boroland (NDFB) was an armed separatist outfit which sought to obtain a sovereign Boroland for the Bodo people. It is designated as a terrorist organisation by the Government of India.

NDFB traces its origin to Bodo Security Force, a militant group formed in 1986. The current name was adopted in 1994, after the group rejected Bodo Accord signed between the Government of India and ABSU-BPAC. The group has carried out several attacks in Assam, targeting non-Bodo civilians as well as the security forces. In particular, it has targeted Santhal, Munda and Oraon adivasis (tribals), whose ancestors had been brought to Assam as tea labourers during British Raj. Its involvement in attacks on Adivasis during Bodo-Adivasi ethnic clash during the 1996 Assam Legislative Assembly elections led to the formation of Adivasi Cobra Force, a rival militant group. After 1996, NDFB was also involved in conflicts with the militant group Bodo Liberation Tigers Force (which surrendered in 2003). Since 2000, NDFB has increasingly targeted Bangladeshi migrants in what it claims to be the Boro territory.

During the 1990s, NDFB established 12 camps on the Bhutan-Assam border. After suffering major reverses during Royal Bhutan Army's Operation All Clear, NDFB signed a ceasefire with the Indian authorities in May 2005.

This was followed by a split in the group: NDFB (P), the progressive faction supported peace talks with the government, while the faction led by Nabla opposed the talks. In 2012, following the arrest of their chairman, NDFB of Nabla faction split further, leading to the formation of another new faction, which was led by a non-Bodo I. K. Songbijit as an interim president of the interim council. This faction continued to indulge in militancy, and has been blamed by the government for May and December 2014 attacks.

The general assembly of the outfit held on 14 and 15 April 2015 vowed to revamp their national struggle and declared that the former interim national council of NDFB led by Songbijit is dissolved and a new national council was formed to fight for the liberation of sovereign, independent Boroland.

The NDFB signed a peace treaty with the government in 2020 and disbanded itself.

Objectives 

The main grievances of the group are the under-development in the region and the influx of immigrants. It aims to address these issues by seceding from India, and establishing a sovereign Boroland. The NDFB constitution, adopted on 10 March 1998, lists its objectives as the following:
 Liberate Boroland from the Indian expansionism and occupation;
 Free the Boro nation from the colonialist exploitation, oppression and domination;
 Establish a Democratic Socialist Society to promote Liberty, Equality and Fraternity; and
 Uphold the integrity and sovereignty of Boroland.

The promotion of the Roman script for the Bodo language is also a significant objective of NDFB and are against the use of Devanagari script for the language.

History 

The Bodos are an ethno-linguistic community native to the Brahmaputra Valley in Assam state of India. In the mid-1980s, Bodo politicians, alleging discrimination against Bodos in Assam, intensified their campaign for the creation of Bodo-majority Bodoland. While majority of the Bodos envisaged Bodoland as an autonomous territory or state within India, a small section demanded complete sovereignty. NDFB was formed by secessionist Bodos on 3 October 1986 as the Bodo Security Force (BdSF), under the leadership of Ranjan Daimary, in Odla Khasibari village (near Udalguri). BdSF carried out several violent attacks against non-Bodo civilians. On 12 December 1992, it attacked the 7th Assam Police Battalion headquarters at Choraikhola in Kokrajahar district, and decamped with 160 self-loading rifles (SLR) and 5 light machine guns (LMG).

The Bodoland movement was mainly led by the political organisations All Bodo Students Union (ABSU) and Bodo Peoples' Action Committee (BPAC). In 1993, these two groups signed the Bodo Accord with Indian government, agreeing to the formation of Bodoland Autonomous Council within Assam. BdSF opposed this Accord. Shortly after the Accord, the Assam State Government refused to hand over 2,750 villages to the proposed Council, arguing that Bodos formed less than 50% of the population in these villages. Following this, the BdSF was renamed to National Democratic Front of Bodoland (NDFB) on 25 November 1994. The NDFB then launched an ethnic cleansing campaign, attacking non-Bodo communities in these villages. During the 1996 Assam Legislative Assembly elections, it killed hundreds of Santhal, Munda and Oraon adivasis (tribals), whose ancestors had been brought to Assam as tea labourers during British Raj. In response, the tribals formed Adivasi Cobra Force, their own militant group.

In the mid-1990s, NDFB also faced a rival within the Bodo community, in form of Bodo Liberation Tigers Force (BLTF). The BLTF had evolved from an older militant group called the Bodo Volunteer Force. It considered NDFB's secessionist agenda unrealistic and unattainable, and focused on establishment of an autonomous Bodo territory within India. After 1996, the two groups clashed violently for supremacy. BLTF allied with Bengali Tiger Force to protect Bengalis from NDFB attacks, and also supported Indian security forces against NDFB. The conflicts between Christian-dominated NDFB and Hindu-dominated BLTF polarised the Bodoland movement along religious lines. In 2003, BLTF surrendered en masse in return for the establishment of the Bodoland Territorial Council.

NDFB had established 12 camps on the Bhutan-Assam border. During 2003-2004, the Royal Bhutan Army destroyed these camps as part of its Operation All Clear. NDFB chief Ranjan Daimary was offered amnesty by the Assam Chief Minister Tarun Gogoi in December 2003, but rejected the offer. On 8 October 2004, the NDFB announced a six-month-long unilateral ceasefire, that came into effect on 15 October. However, the Government continued its operations against the group. On 15 April 2005, NDFB extended the ceasefire. The Government released its general secretary Govinda Basumatary to open a channel of communication with the organisation's Bangladesh-based leadership. This resulted in a ceasefire agreement between NDFB and the Government on 25 May 2005. The agreement stated that the NDFB agree to cease hostile action against security forces and civilians. In return, the security forces would not carry out operations against the group's members. The agreement also stipulated that NDFB members would disarm and live in camps protected by the military for a year, and would refrain from assisting other militant groups. The pact came into force on 1 June 2005. However, certain factions of NDFB continued militancy. In May 2006, five members of the security forces were abducted and killed by suspected NDFB members in Assam's Udalguri district. The group also continued to clash with cadres of the ex-BLTF (Bodo Liberation Tiger Force). On 5 June 2006, two former BLTF cadres were killed by NDFB militants in the Karbi Anglong district, and one former member of the disbanded group was lynched by suspected NDFB militants in Golaghat district on 3 June 2007.

In 2008, the group split into two after Ranjan Daimary's name appeared in the 2008 Assam bombings case. NDFB (P), the pro-talks factions led by B Sungthagra supported peace talks with the governments. NDFB (R), led by Daimary, refused to give up militancy. In December 2008, the NDFB (P) indicated its plans to indirectly or directly participate the Lok Sabha elections. In 2012, I. K. Songbijit, the chief of the NDFB (R) faction's "Boroland Army", announced the formation of a nine-member "interim national council", resulting in a split. NDFB (S), the faction led by Songbijit, is now the most dreaded faction. Amit Shah signed a historic peace treaty with factions on NDFB in February 2020.

Splits
After the Operation All Clear in 2003 the then united NDFB decided to go for ceasefire and talk to resolve the political issue in 2004. The proposal was submitted in 2008 and there was a meeting of the joint military council in Manipur. The secretary in the ministry of development of north east region, Naveen Verma, told the general secretary of the outfit that they must amend their proposition instead of negotiation at table or in other words they were forced to revise it, amend it and write a new memorandum.

There would have been no talks and extension of ceasefire unless the proposition was revised and amended which was submitted by the faction now known as National Democratic Front of Boroland - Progressive and the faction led by Ranjan Daimary who rejected it was then known as the Anti-Talks Faction, which further split into two factions.

Leaders

National Council members 

 President : B. Saoraigwra
 Vice-President : G. Bidai
 General Secretary : B.R. Ferrenga

Equipment

Weapons

NDFB have a sizeable number of sophisticated weapons including AK-series rifles. Since they have camps in Myanmar across Arunachal Pradesh, they have easy access to the latest weapons.

Activities 

NDFB has carried out bombings, kidnappings and murders in Assam. Due to armed conflict between NDFB and Adivasi Cobra Force, the NDFB have attacked Adivasi many times. The Assam Government has accused it of launching an ethnic cleansing campaign against the Oriya Adivasis and Bengali Muslim settlers in the region.

The group primarily operates in the region to the north and north-west of the Brahmaputra river. It is active in the Bongaigaon, Kokrajhar, Darrang, Barpeta, Dhubri, Nalbari and Sonitpur districts of Assam. It has also been active in the Garo Hills region of Meghalaya. It has used the neighbouring Bhutan as a refuge, crossing the border in the Manas National Park area. In December 2003, the Royal Bhutan Army initiated a crackdown on the group's activities in Bhutan.

Between 1992 and 2001, the violence involving NDFB resulted in the deaths of 167 security forces personnel and over 1200 civilians:

Attacks attributed to NDFB 

The attacks attributed to the NDFB include (SATP). Some incident don't have evidence but NDFB is believed to be involved.

Disbanding 
NDFB disbanded itself at two locations in accordance with a clause in Memorandum of Settlement (MoS) signed by the four factions and the other stakeholders with the Indian Government on 27 January 2020. While disbanding, the NDFB (P) leader Gobinda Basumatry said "To find a solution to political, economic, social and cultural issues of Bodo people, the Bodo Security Force was formed in 1986. It was renamed as NDFB in 1994. Our fight has finally come to an end after 34 years of armed struggle within and outside the country... from Nepal, Bangladesh, Myanmar and Bhutan. We believe that the NDFB movement has been a successful one and so we are disbanding the group."

See also
 Insurgency in Northeast India
 List of terrorist organisations in India
 ULFA

References

1994 establishments in Assam
Separatism in India
Politics of Assam
Bhutan–India relations
Bodo nationalism
Organisations designated as terrorist by India
Organizations based in Asia designated as terrorist
Secessionist organizations in Asia
Insurgency in Northeast India
Left-wing militant groups in India
Terrorism in Assam
Christian terrorism in Asia